The Journal of Pediatric Health Care is a bimonthly peer-reviewed medical journal covering pediatrics. It was established in 1987 and is published by Elsevier on behalf of the National Association of Pediatric Nurse Practitioners, of which it is the official journal. The editor-in-chief is Martha K. Swartz (Yale University). According to the Journal Citation Reports, the journal has a 2015 impact factor of 1.615.

References

External links

Pediatrics journals
Publications established in 1987
Bimonthly journals
Elsevier academic journals
English-language journals